James M. Chatterton   (October 14, 1864 – December 15, 1944) was a 19th-century professional baseball player. He played for the Kansas City Cowboys of the Union Association in 1884.

External links

1864 births
1944 deaths
Major League Baseball first basemen
Major League Baseball outfielders
Kansas City Cowboys (UA) players
19th-century baseball players
Salem Fairies players
Baseball players from New York (state)